Francis Kojo Arthur (born 22 November 1954) is a former member of the Sixth Parliament of the Fourth Republic of Ghana, representing the Gomoa West Constituency in Central region of Ghana.

Personal life 
Arthur is married with ten children. He identifies as a Christian (Catholic).

Early life and education 
Arthur was born on 22 November 1954 in Gomoa Abasa Number 2 in the Central region of Ghana.

He attended the Kwame Nkrumah University of Science and Technology where he obtained a master's degree in Animal Breeding in 2000.

Career 
Prior to becoming a member of parliament, Arthur was a tutor at Anglican Senior High School in Kumasi.

Politics 
Arthur is a member of National Democratic Congress. In 2009, he succeeded Joe Kingsley Hackman as the member of parliament for Gomoa West after contesting and winning the seat in the 2008 Ghanaian elections. During the elections he garnered 15,985 votes which represented 47.47% of the total valid votes cast and hence defeated the other contestants. He contested again in the 2012 Ghanaian Elections and won giving him the chance to represent his constituency for the second term. In the 2012 elections, he garnered 27,624 votes which represented 56.67% of the total valid votes cast.

However, in 2016, he could not contest in the 2016 Ghanaian elections because he lost the National Democratic Congress (NDC) parliamentary elections. Hence the winner, Samuel Fletcher, represented the NDC in the 2016 Ghanaian elections.

References 

Living people
Ghanaian Roman Catholics
National Democratic Congress (Ghana) politicians
Kwame Nkrumah University of Science and Technology alumni
1954 births
Ghanaian MPs 2009–2013
Ghanaian MPs 2013–2017